The Type 44 torpedo boats were a group of six or nine torpedo boats that were designed for Nazi Germany's Kriegsmarine during World War II. Ordered in 1944, none of the ships were laid down before the German surrender in May 1945.

Background and description
Much like the preceding Type 39 torpedo boats, the Type 44s were intended for general-purpose duties. Unhappy with the excess steam consumption of the Type 39's engine auxiliary machinery, the Kriegsmarine experimented with using three-phase electric motors to power the auxiliary machinery and partially automating its operations under the direction of Dipl.-Ing. Illies at Schichau-Werke's shipyard in Elbing, East Prussia. One boiler system was built there for trials and full-size mockups of turbine and boiler rooms were also constructed. Although attracted by the prospect of greater efficiency at lower speeds than the existing propulsion machinery, the Kriegsmarine did not believe that the "Illies-Schichau" machinery was ready for use until 1944 when the Type 44 was being designed.

Their hull was intended to be divided into 12 watertight compartments and it was designed with a double bottom that covered 70% of their length. They would have been manned by 8 officers and 214 sailors.

Armament
The planned main armament of the Type 44s would have been four of the new  KM44 dual-purpose guns in two twin-gun mounts, one each fore and aft of the superstructure. The mount had an elevation range of -15° to +75°. The KM44 fired  projectiles at muzzle velocities of either , respectively. The gun had a rate of fire of 12–14 rounds per minute and the ships were designed to carry 400 rounds per gun. An anti-aircraft director would have been installed on the roof of the bridge. Dedicated anti-aircraft defense would have been provided by ten  guns in five twin mounts for which 20,000 rounds would have been stowed. The Type 44s would also have been equipped with six above-water  torpedo tubes in two triple mounts amidships and to carry 30 mines.

Construction
The Kriegsmarine ordered nine Type 44s (T52–T60) from Schichau on 28 March 1944 with yard numbers 1720–1745 and 1447–1449. The ships were scheduled for completion beginning on 15 September 1946, but none of them were laid down before the contracts were canceled when the shipyard was forced to close by advancing Soviet forces in January 1945.

Notes

Citations

References

World War II torpedo boats of Germany
Torpedo boats of the Kriegsmarine